Carbomethoxymethylenetriphenylphosphorane is a chemical compound used in organic syntheses. It contains a phosphorus atom bound to three phenyl groups, and doubly bound to the alpha position of methyl acetate. It undergoes a Wittig reaction. It is used in the Vitamin B12 total synthesis.

Production
Carbomethoxymethylenetriphenylphosphorane can be made via a multistep reaction using bromoacetic acid, dicyclohexylcarbodiimide, and triphenylphosphine. This makes a phosphonium salt, which is converted to the final product by sodium carbonate in water.

Reactions
Carbomethoxymethylenetriphenylphosphorane reacts with aldehydes to give a two carbon atom extension. The carbomethoxymethylene group replaces the oxygen of the aldehyde to give a trans- double bond.

References

Phosphanes
Esters
Phenyl compounds
Organic compounds